KMMO may refer to:

 KMMO (AM), a radio station (1300 AM) licensed to Marshall, Missouri, United States
 KMMO-FM, a radio station (102.9 FM) licensed to Marshall, Missouri, United States